The Second ministry of Armand-Emmanuel du Plessis de Richelieu was formed on 20 February 1820 after the dismissal of the Ministry of Élie Decazes by King Louis XVIII of France. It was dissolved on 12 December  1821 and replaced on 14 December 1821 by the Ministry of Joseph de Villèle.

Ministers
Most of the ministers from the previous cabinet remained in place. Élie, duc Decazes was replaced as president of the council by the Duke of Richelieu, who was not given a ministerial portfolio. On the 21 February Joseph Jérôme, Comte Siméon, was appointed Minister of the Interior.
The ministers were:

References

Sources

French governments
1820 establishments in France
1821 disestablishments in France
Cabinets established in 1820
Cabinets disestablished in 1821